Mul-T-Lock is an Israeli locking products manufacturer and part of Assa Abloy.

History

Mul-T-Lock was established in 1973 and become famous for its four-way lock invention. In 1976, the success of Mul-T-Lock's four-way lock spread worldwide when marketing efforts expanded globally. With the company's rapid expansion, Mul-T-Lock expanded its manufacturing plant. By 1982, the company had significantly increased its product line to include a wide range of high-security cylinders, locks, and applications. In 1987, Mul-T-Lock opened its first sales division in the US and in 2000 changed ownership to Assa Abloy

Mul-T-Lock has expanded its global activity; with European sales units and its entrance into the APAC market. The company also began to broaden its operations by manufacturing automatic key-cutting and assembly machines for its customers.

The company is owned by the Assa Abloy Group.

Product categories

 Mechanical locking solutions
 Electromechanical access control systems
 Patented locking solutions
 Cylinders
 Padlocks
 Locks and Lock cases
 Vehicle protection solutions
 Master key systems
 Key management systems
 Industrial locks
 Key cutting machines

References 

Lock manufacturers
Manufacturing companies of Israel
Manufacturing companies established in 1973
Israeli brands
Yavne
1973 establishments in Israel
Israeli inventions